The George B. Marsh Building is a historic building in Nogales, Arizona. It was built between 1905 and 1914 for businessman George B. Marsh, and designed in the Chicago school architectural style. The first building completed was the post office in 1905, followed by the George B. Marsh Building for Fulton Market in July 1905, the George B. Marsh Building in 1906, and the Oasis Printing Building in 1911. It has been listed on the National Register of Historic Places since August 29, 1985.

References

National Register of Historic Places in Santa Cruz County, Arizona
Chicago school architecture in the United States
Commercial buildings completed in 1914
1914 establishments in Arizona